Rajesh Vedprakash (Hindi: राजेश वेदप्रकाश, born as Rajesh Vedprakash Maingi राजेश वेदप्रकाश मैंगी; October 7, 1968) as an Indian voice artist who can speak English, Hindi and Urdu. He is a 1990 batch alumnus of Indian Theater Department,  Panjab University, Chandigarh.  In 1991 he shifted his base to Mumbai. He anchored live shows, made documentaries, short films and conducted workshops with Partap Sharma. He is a body building promoter and patron in chief of Panchkula Body Building and Fitness Association.

Rajesh Vedprakash is a director and voice trainer.  His works include various productions based on social issues like dowry and female foeticide, Panchatantra and Biblical stories. He has to his credit five voices in a single production. He conducts workshops on communication skills and specializes in performing character voices, theatrical trailers, radio spots and lending voice to various television channels.

Dubbing roles

Animated series

References

1968 births
Living people
Indian male voice actors
Haryanvi cinema